The 2002–03 Indian National Football League, also known as the Oil PSU National Football League for sponsorship reasons, was the seventh season of National Football League, the top Indian league for association football clubs, since its inception in 1996. The season began on 17 November 2002 and concluded on 28 April 2003. East Bengal won the title, their second, with a game to spare.

Overview
It was contested by 12 teams, and East Bengal won the championship under the coach Subhas Bhowmick and this was their second title. Salgaonkar came second and Vasco again came third. HAL (Hindustan Aeronautics Limited) and ITI (Indian Telephone Industries) were relegated from the National Football League next season.

League standings

References

External links 
 7th "Oil PSU" National Football League at Rec.Sport.Soccer Statistics Foundation

National Football League (India) seasons
1
India